The Moberly Monitor-Index is a daily newspaper published Monday through Friday mornings in Moberly, Missouri, United States. It is owned by Westplex Media Group, who acquired it from Gannett in 2021. The paper covers Moberly and Randolph County, Missouri.

References

External links
 

Gannett publications
Publications established in 1869
Newspapers published in Missouri
Randolph County, Missouri
1869 establishments in Missouri